Ronald Joseph Zlatoper (March 21, 1942 – April 21, 2022) was a United States Navy four star admiral who served as Commander in Chief, United States Pacific Fleet (CINCPACFLT) from 1994 to 1996.

Zlatoper was born in Cleveland, Ohio.

Zlatoper was the Founder of Strategic Transitions Research. He served as Co-Chairman and Chief Executive Officer of Sanchez Computer Associates, Inc. He served as a Trustee of Rensselaer Polytechnic Institute. He served on the boards of Penn State University-Great Valley, Board of Advisors member of the School of Business & Public Management at the George Washington University, U.S.S. Missouri Memorial Association, and the Military Aviation Museum of the Pacific. He was a Regent for Chaminade University. He was also active on the boards of the Pacific Aviation Museum Pearl Harbor; the East-West Center; the Vietnam Veterans Memorial Foundation; Chamber of Commerce of Hawai'i — Military Affairs Council; Catholic Charities Hawai'i; and was a member of the Alexis de Tocqueville Society of the United Way.

During his time as an undergraduate at RPI, Ronald was a member of Pi Kappa Phi fraternity. He was inducted into the fraternity's hall of fame in 2014. He received his master's degree in management from the MIT Sloan School of Management. He died on April 21, 2022, in Atlanta, Georgia.

1967 USS Forrestal fire
On July 29, 1967, Zlatoper, then a Lieutenant, kept a careful record of events in the squadron duty officer log of the 1967 USS Forrestal fire.

Honors
He had received numerous personal decorations including the Defense Distinguished Service Medal; the Navy Distinguished Service Medal; the Legion of Merit; the Distinguished Flying Cross; the Meritorious Service Medal; the Air Medal; and the Navy Commendation Medal (with Combat "V"); plus various campaign and unit awards. He is the honored recipient of the Japanese Grand Cordon of the Order of the Rising Sun and the Korean Presidential Tong Il medal.

  Defense Distinguished Service Medal
  Navy Distinguished Service Medal
  Legion of Merit
  Distinguished Flying Cross
  Meritorious Service Medal
  Air Medal
  Navy and Marine Corps Commendation Medal with Valor Device

References

1941 births
2022 deaths
Military personnel from Cleveland
United States Navy admirals
Rensselaer Polytechnic Institute alumni
American people of Slovenian descent
Recipients of the Distinguished Flying Cross (United States)
Recipients of the Legion of Merit
MIT Sloan School of Management alumni
Recipients of the Air Medal
Recipients of the Defense Superior Service Medal
Recipients of the Defense Distinguished Service Medal
Recipients of the Navy Distinguished Service Medal
Burials at Arlington National Cemetery